John Len Chatman (September 3, 1915 – February 24, 1988), known professionally as Memphis Slim, was an American blues pianist, singer, and composer.  He led a series of bands that, reflecting the popular appeal of jump blues, included saxophones, bass, drums, and piano. A song he first cut in 1947, "Every Day I Have the Blues", has become a blues standard, recorded by many other artists.  He made over 500 recordings.

He was posthumously inducted into the Blues Hall of Fame in 1989.

Biography

Memphis Slim was born John Len Chatman, in Memphis, Tennessee. For his first recordings, for Okeh Records in 1940, he used the name of his father, Peter Chatman (who sang, played piano and guitar, and operated juke joints); it is commonly believed that he did so to honor his father. He started performing under the name "Memphis Slim" later that year but continued to publish songs under the name Peter Chatman.

He spent most of the 1930s performing in honky-tonks, dance halls, and gambling joints in West Memphis, Arkansas, and southeast Missouri. He settled in Chicago in 1939 and began teaming with the guitarist and singer Big Bill Broonzy in clubs soon afterwards. In 1940 and 1941, he recorded two songs for Bluebird Records that became part of his repertoire for decades, "Beer Drinking Woman" and "Grinder Man Blues". These were released under the name "Memphis Slim," given to him by Bluebird's producer, Lester Melrose. Slim became a regular session musician for Bluebird, and his piano talents supported established stars such as John Lee "Sonny Boy" Williamson, Washboard Sam, and Jazz Gillum. Many of Slim's recordings and performances until the mid-1940s were with Broonzy, who had recruited Slim to be his piano player after the death of his accompanist Joshua Altheimer in 1940.

After World War II, Slim began leading bands that generally included saxophones, bass, drums, and piano, reflecting the popular appeal of jump blues. With the decline of blues recording by the major labels, Slim worked with emerging independent labels. Starting in late 1945, he recorded with trios for the small Chicago-based Hy-Tone Records. With a lineup of alto saxophone, tenor sax, piano, and string bass (Willie Dixon played the instrument on the first session), he signed with the Miracle label in the fall of 1946. One of the songs recorded at the first session was the ebullient boogie "Rockin' the House," from which his band would take its name. Slim and the House Rockers recorded mainly for Miracle through 1949, with some commercial success. Among the songs they recorded were "Messin' Around" (which reached number one on the R&B charts in 1948) and "Harlem Bound". In 1947, the day after producing a concert by Slim, Broonzy, and Williamson at New York City's Town Hall, the folklorist Alan Lomax brought the three musicians to the Decca Records studios and recorded with Slim on vocal and piano. Lomax presented sections of this recording on BBC Radio in the early 1950s as a documentary, The Art of the Negro, and later released an expanded version as the LP Blues in the Mississippi Night. In 1949, Slim expanded his combo to a quintet by adding a drummer; the group was now spending most of its time on tour, leading to off-contract recording sessions for King Records in Cincinnati and Peacock Records in Houston.

One of Slim's 1947 recordings for Miracle, released in 1949, was originally titled "Nobody Loves Me". It has become famous as "Every Day I Have the Blues." The song was recorded in 1950 by Lowell Fulson and subsequently by numerous other artists, including B. B. King, Elmore James, T-Bone Walker, Ray Charles, Eric Clapton, Natalie Cole, Ella Fitzgerald, Jimi Hendrix, Mahalia Jackson, Sarah Vaughan, Carlos Santana, John Mayer and Lou Rawls. Joe Williams recorded it in 1952 for Checker Records; his remake from 1956 (included on the album Count Basie Swings, Joe Williams Sings) was inducted into the Grammy Hall of Fame in 1992.

Early in 1950, Miracle succumbed to financial troubles, but its owners regrouped to form the Premium label, and Slim remained on board until the successor company faltered in the summer of 1951. His February 1951 session for Premium saw two changes in the House Rockers' lineup: Slim started using two tenor saxophones instead of the alto and tenor combination, and he made a trial of adding the guitarist Ike Perkins. His last session for Premium kept the two-tenor lineup but dispensed with the guitar. During his time with Premium, Slim first recorded his song "Mother Earth".

Slim made just one session for King, but the company bought his Hy-Tone sides in 1948 and acquired his Miracle masters after that company failed in 1950. He was never a Chess artist, but Leonard Chess bought most of the Premium masters after the demise of Premium.

After a year with Mercury Records, Slim signed with United Records in Chicago; the A&R man, Lew Simpkins, knew him from Miracle and Premium. The timing was propitious, because he had just added the guitarist Matt "Guitar" Murphy to his group. He remained with United through the end of 1954, when the company began to cut back on blues recording.

After 1954, Slim did not have a steady relationship with a record company until 1958, when he signed with Vee-Jay Records. In 1959 his band, still featuring Murphy, recorded the album Memphis Slim at the Gate of the Horn, which featured a lineup of his best-known songs, including "Mother Earth", "Gotta Find My Baby", "Rockin' the Blues", "Steppin' Out", and "Slim's Blues". In December 1959, Willie Dixon's debut album, Willie's Blues, was released. Memphis Slim was given almost equal credit on the album as Dixon's piano accompanist. Memphis Slim played on all of the tracks, and wrote the two numbers that were not penned by Dixon.

Slim first appeared outside the United States in 1960, touring with Willie Dixon, with whom he returned to Europe in 1962 as a featured artist in the first of the series of American Folk Festival concerts organized by Dixon, which brought many notable blues artists to Europe in the 1960s and 1970s. The duo released several albums together on Folkways Records, including Memphis Slim and Willie Dixon at the Village Gate with Pete Seeger (1962).

In 1962, Slim moved permanently to Paris, and his engaging personality and well-honed presentation of playing, singing, and storytelling about the blues secured his position as one of the most prominent blues artists for nearly three decades. He appeared on television in numerous European countries, acted in several French films and wrote the score for À nous deux France (1970), and performed regularly in Paris, throughout Europe, and on return visits to the United States. In the last years of his life, he teamed up with the respected jazz drummer George Collier. The two toured Europe together and became friends. After Collier died in August 1987, Slim rarely appeared in public, although he reunited with Matt "Guitar" Murphy for a gig at Antone's in Austin, Texas, in 1987.

Two years before his death, Slim was named a Commander in the Ordre des Arts et des Lettres by the Ministry of Culture of the Republic of France. In addition, the U.S. Senate honored Slim with the title of Ambassador-at-Large of Good Will. 

Memphis Slim died of renal failure on February 24, 1988, in Paris, at the age of 72. He is buried at Galilee Memorial Gardens in Memphis, Tennessee.

He was posthumously inducted into the Blues Hall of Fame in 1989. He was inducted into the Memphis Music Hall of Fame in 2015.

Charting singles

Albums

References

Bibliography

External links

 Music Match Memphis Slim
 [ Memphis Slim biography and discography] at AllMusic website
 Memphis Slim recordings at the Discography of American Historical Recordings.
 Memphis Slim discography on Folkways Records
 Memphis Slim obituary from The New York Times

1915 births
1988 deaths
American blues pianists
American male pianists
American blues singers
Musicians from Memphis, Tennessee
Singers from Tennessee
King Records artists
Vee-Jay Records artists
Chess Records artists
Black Lion Records artists
Black & Blue Records artists
United Records artists
Deaths from kidney failure
20th-century American singers
Blues musicians from Tennessee
20th-century American pianists
20th-century American male musicians